Stadio di Corso Sebastopoli was a multi-use stadium in Turin, Italy. It was initially used as the stadium of Foot-Ball Club Juventus matches.  It was replaced by Stadio di Corso Marsiglia in 1963.  The capacity of the stadium was 10,000 spectators.

References

Corso
Corso
Juventus F.C.